Elections to Three Rivers District Council were held on 3 May 2012 to elect one-third of the council of Three Rivers district in England.

The Liberal Democrats won the largest number of seats and the most votes.  The Conservatives failed to strengthen their position against the Liberal Democrats, who remained in overall control of Three Rivers. Labour gained two seats, including one they had lost to the British National Party; the incumbent moved to the English Democrats Party in 2010 and stood as the EDP candidate. Overall, however, this council remains under firm LibDem control, with most seats contested between them and the Conservatives, and Labour having little prospect of improving their own representation.

After the election, the composition of the council was 
 Liberal Democrat 28 (-1)
 Conservative 14 (no change)
 Labour 6 (+2)
 English Democrats Party 0 (-1) (originally held for the BNP in 2008)

Election result

Ward results

Defending incumbent marked with "*"

References

 BBC News results for Three Rivers
 Results on Three Rivers District Council official website

2012
2012 English local elections
2010s in Hertfordshire